Chaungzon Township is a township of Mawlamyine District in the Mon State of Myanmar. Chaungzon is the capital of Chaungzon township.

References 

Townships of Mon State